Branislav Jánoš (born January 8, 1971) is a Slovak former professional ice hockey player.

He played in the Slovak Extraliga with HC Dukla Trenčín, HKm Zvolen, HC Slovan Bratislava, MsHK Žilina, HC '05 Banská Bystrica and ŠHK 37 Piešťany. He also played in the Czech Extraliga for HC Zlín, HC Oceláři Třinec and HC Vítkovice, as well as in the Swedish Elitserien for Brynas IF.

Jánoš was a member of the Slovakia national team for the 1994 and 1998 Winter Olympics.

Career statistics

Regular season and playoffs

International

References

External links

1971 births
HC '05 Banská Bystrica players
HC Slovan Bratislava players
Brynäs IF players
HK Dubnica players
HK Dukla Trenčín players
Ice hockey players at the 1994 Winter Olympics
Ice hockey players at the 1998 Winter Olympics
EC Kapfenberg players
Lausitzer Füchse players
Living people
HC Oceláři Třinec players
Olympic ice hockey players of Slovakia
ŠHK 37 Piešťany players
Slovak ice hockey left wingers
Sportspeople from Trenčín
GKS Tychy (ice hockey) players
HC Vítkovice players
MsHK Žilina players
PSG Berani Zlín players
HKM Zvolen players
Czechoslovak ice hockey left wingers
Expatriate ice hockey players in Austria
Expatriate ice hockey players in Poland
Slovak expatriate ice hockey players in Sweden
Slovak expatriate ice hockey players in the Czech Republic
Slovak expatriate ice hockey players in Germany
Slovak expatriate sportspeople in Austria
Slovak expatriate sportspeople in Poland